Jonathan Barnes is a British writer, whose first novel, The Somnambulist, was published in 2007. He is also the author of The Domino Men (2008), an indirect sequel.

Barnes earned a first in English literature from the University of Oxford. Currently, he lives in Norfolk and reviews for The Times Literary Supplement.

References

External links

Living people
Place of birth missing (living people)
Year of birth missing (living people)
British fantasy writers
British male novelists